Cochas District is one of fifteen districts of the province Concepción in Peru.

See also 
 Utkhulasu

References